My Dangerous Wife is a 2020 South Korean television series starring Kim Jung-eun, and Choi Won-young. It was premiered on MBN on October 5, 2020. It is the Korean adaptation of the 2016 Japanese television series Boku no Yabai Tsuma.

Synopsis
A story about a couple who starts a war at home with extremely dangerous choices, and about finding the meaning of life as a husband and wife in Korean society.

Kim Yoon Cheol (Choi Won Young) is a famous chef and runs a popular Italian restaurant. He is happily married to Shim Jae Kyung (Kim Jung Eun) – or so he thinks until he meets the beautiful Jin Sun Mi (Choi Yu Hwa), a staff member at his restaurant.

Despite his six-year marriage to Shim Jae Kyung, he falls head-over-heels for Jin Sun Mi – and begins a steamy affair.

The two start to hatch a plot to kill Shim Jae Kyung – but when Kim Yoon Cheol arrives home one day, he finds that his wife is nowhere to be found and there are bloodstains everywhere.

He eventually learns that she has been kidnapped – and, returning to his senses, realizes how much he loves her. He resolves to find his wife, no matter what the cost.

But as he begins his quest, he starts to realize that his wife may have hidden depths even he could not have ever fathomed…

Cast

Main
 Kim Jung-eun as Shim Jae-kyung, (37 years old) wife of Yoon-chul, an ordinary housewife. Influencer.
 Choi Won-young as Kim Yoon-chul, (39 years old) Jae-kyung's husband, CEO of Cafe Old Crop.

Supporting
 Choi Yu-hwa as Jin Sun-mi (33 years old)-Yun chul's restaurant team leader
 Ahn Nae-sang as Noh Chang-beom, (48 years old), pawnshop owner, private detective, Yoon-chul's ex-brother-in-law
 Shim Hye-jin as Ha Eun-hye, (52 years old) as a neighboring wife, CEO of a small and medium-sized business related to life beauty in the past Yun chul and Jae-kyung couple's neighbors.
 Lee Jun-hyeok as Seo Ji-tae, (40 years old)-Inspector homicide detective. Father of twins
 Ahn Seo-ha as San-i (9 yo) – Ji-tae and Hee-jeong's twin
 Yun Jong-seok as Jo Min-kyu, (37 years old), younger neighbor's husband, a past home shopping model.
 Yoon Ye-hee as Kim Yoon-hee, (43 years old), Yoon chul's older sister, Jeong soon's eldest daughter. Changbeom's ex-wife.
 Baek Soo-jang as Song Yu-min, (34 years old), painter, financial junior in art college. A pure man who has a consistent heart for Jae-kyung, a senior in college, and a romanticist
 Kim Ja-young as Mother Jeong-soon, (69 years old)
 Lee Hyo-bi as Chae-rim

Ratings

Notes

References

External links
  
 
 

Maeil Broadcasting Network television dramas
2020 South Korean television series debuts
2020 South Korean television series endings
South Korean mystery television series
South Korean thriller television series
Korean-language television shows
South Korean television series based on Japanese television series
Television series by KeyEast
Wavve original programming